The Coca-Cola Museum is a museum about the drink Coca-Cola, located on the Gueishan Industrial Park in Taoyuan District, Taoyuan City, Taiwan.

The facility is run by Swire Group, which has an adjacent Coca-Cola bottling plant.  The museum building is colored red, like Coca-Cola.

Transportation

The museum is accessible by walking 1.9km (1.2 miles) South East from Taoyuan Station of the Taiwan Railways Administration.

See also
 List of food and beverage museums
 List of museums in Taiwan

References

External links
 Coca-Cola Museum, Taoyuan Gueishan Township Office

Food museums in Taiwan
Museums in Taoyuan City
Taoyuan District
Coca-Cola buildings and structures
Drink museums in Taiwan